FAIR data are data which meet principles of findability, accessibility, interoperability, and reusability (FAIR). The acronym and principles were defined in a March 2016 paper in the journal Scientific Data by a consortium of scientists and organizations.

The FAIR principles emphasize machine-actionability (i.e., the capacity of computational systems to find, access, interoperate, and reuse data with none or minimal human intervention) because humans increasingly rely on computational support to deal with data as a result of the increase in volume, complexity, and creation speed of data.

The abbreviation  is sometimes used to indicate that the dataset or database in question complies with the FAIR principles and also carries an explicit data‑capable open license.

FAIR principles, as published by GO FAIR

Acceptance and implementation of FAIR data principles 
Before FAIR a 2007 paper was the earliest paper discussing similar ideas related to data accessibility.

At the 2016 G20 Hangzhou summit, the G20 leaders issued a statement endorsing the application of FAIR principles to research.

In 2016 a group of Australian organisations developed a Statement on FAIR Access to Australia's Research Outputs, which aimed to extend the principles to research outputs more generally.

In 2017 Germany, Netherlands and France agreed to establish  an international office to support the FAIR initiative, the GO FAIR International Support and Coordination Office. 

Other international organisations active in the research data ecosystem, such as CODATA or Research Data Alliance (RDA) also support FAIR implementations by their communities. FAIR principles implementation assessment is being explored by FAIR Data Maturity Model Working Group of RDA, CODATA's strategic Decadal Programme "Data for Planet: Making data work for cross-domain challenges" mentions FAIR data principles as a fundamental enabler of data driven science.   

The Association of European Research Libraries recommends the use of FAIR principles.

A 2017 paper by advocates of FAIR data reported that awareness of the FAIR concept was increasing among various researchers and institutes, but also, understanding of the concept was becoming confused as different people apply their own differing perspectives to it.

Guides on implementing FAIR data practices state that the cost of a data management plan in compliance with FAIR data practices should be 5% of the total research budget.

In 2019 the Global Indigenous Data Alliance (GIDA) released the CARE Principles for Indigenous Data Governance as a complementary guide. The CARE principles extend principles outlined in FAIR data to include Collective benefit, Authority to control, Responsibility, and Ethics to ensure data guidelines address historical contexts and power differentials. The CARE Principles for Indigenous Data Governance were drafted at the International Data Week and Research Data Alliance Plenary co-hosted event "Indigenous Data Sovereignty Principles for the Governance of Indigenous Data Workshop," 8 November 2018, Gaborone, Botswana.

The lack of information on how to implement the guidelines have led to inconsistent interpretations of them.

In January 2020, representatives of nine groups of universities around the world produced the Sorbonne declaration on research data rights, which included a commitment to FAIR data, and called on governments to provide support to enable it.

In 2021, researchers identified the FAIR principles as a conceptual component of data catalog software tools, with the other components being metadata management, business context and data responsibility roles.

In April 2022, Matthias Scheffler and colleagues argued in Nature that FAIR principles are "a must" so that data mining and artificial intelligence can extract useful scientific information from the data.

See also
Data management
Remix culture
Open access
Open data – datasets and databases carrying an explicit data‑capable open license
Open science

References

External links

FAIR Data and Semantic Publishing, a statement from the lab of the first author of the original paper
Guide to FAIR Data from Dutch Techcentre for Life Sciences
GO FAIR initiative website
FAIR Principles with detailed description of each of the guiding principles by the GO FAIR initiative
A FAIRy tale explaining the FAIR principles, published by the FAIR project

Political statements
Open content
Data management
Open data
Open science